Old Falkenstein Castle ( or Burg Alt-Falkenstein) in the Harz Mountains of Germany is the castle site or burgstall of a high medieval hill castle. It lies on the territory of Falkenstein/Harz in the state of Saxony-Anhalt in the district of Harz. It was built in the 11th century A.D. and destroyed in 1115.

Location 
The ruins of Old Falkenstein are located in the eastern Harz region of Mansfeld Land between Mägdesprung (north of Harzgerode) and Meisdorf (southwest of Falkenstein/Harz) on a rocky ridge above the valley of the River Selke.

History 
The castle was probably built under the lordship of the German Emperor Henry IV. Its architect was the Swabian cleric and later bishop, Benno II of Osnabrück. After the Battle of Welfesholz on 11 February 1115 the castle was slighted under the direction of the Saxon duke, Lothair of Süpplingenburg and was never rebuilt. Afterwards the neighbouring castle of New Falkenstein was built, and the Old Falkenstein was probably no longer occupied from the beginning of the 12th century, as surviving pottery shards indicate.

Layout 
Today, elements of the circular moat (Ringgraben) and advanced rampart (Vorwall) as well as remnants of the northern ring wall (Ringmauer) are still visible.

From the rocky ridge of the ruined castle there are views of the Selke valley. A cross recalls the fatal accident here on 11 July 2003 of local history researcher and area monument curator, Hans Reißmann.

References

Literature 
 Friedrich Stolberg: Befestigungsanlagen im und am Harz – Von der Frühgeschichte bis zur Neuzeit, Verlag August Lax, Issue 2/1983,

External links 
 

Buildings and structures completed in the 11th century
Buildings and structures demolished in the 12th century
Falkenstein (Harz)
Castles in the Harz
Falkenstein, Saxony-Anhalt
Ruined castles in Germany
Imperial castles
11th-century establishments in the Holy Roman Empire
1110s disestablishments in the Holy Roman Empire
1115 disestablishments in Europe